Russian Consulate School in Strasbourg is a Russian international school in Strasbourg, France, serving primary and secondary levels. It was established in 1996.

See also
France–Russia relations
French schools in Russia:
Lycée français Alexandre Dumas de Moscou

References

External links
 Russian Consulate School in Strasbourg 

Russian international schools in France
Education in Strasbourg
1996 establishments in France
Educational institutions established in 1996